MochiView (Motif and ChIP Viewer)  is software that integrates a genome browser and tools for data and Sequence motif visualization and analysis.  The software uses the Java language, contains a fully integrated JavaDB database, is platform-independent, and is freely available.

Description 
MochiView was originally designed as a platform for rapidly browsing, visualizing, and extracting Sequence motifs from ChIP-chip and ChIP-Seq data.  The software uses a generalized data format that serves other purposes as well, such as the visualization and analysis of RNA-Seq data or the import, maintenance, exploration, and analysis of Sequence motif libraries.  The MochiView website contains a detailed feature list and demo videos of the software showing smooth panning/zooming, data/gene/sequence/coordinate browsers, and plot interactivity.  The software was created by Oliver Homann in the laboratory of Alexander Johnson at the University of California at San Francisco.

References

External links
 MochiView website 

Bioinformatics software